Tõstamaa Parish was a rural municipality in southwestern Estonia. It was a part of Pärnu County. The municipality had a population of 1,572 (as of 1 January 2009) and covered an area of 261.01 km2.

Tõstamaa Parish covered part of the flat seashore of western Pärnu County, a low, swampy coastal area bordered by an elevated chain of sand dunes. Behind the dunes spreads a slightly wavy drumlin, where higher places have been reclaimed, but lower ones have remained swampy or meadowland and covered with scattered foliage.  And, although Tõstamaa should mean "high land", its populace have long lived not off the land, but off the sea.
 
Several islands and islets in the Gulf of Riga, including Sorgu and Manilaid, belong to Tõstamaa Parish.

Tõstamaa is home to the historic Tõstamaa Keskkool.

Settlements
Small borough
Tõstamaa
Villages
Alu - Ermistu - Kastna - Kavaru - Kiraste - Kõpu - Lao - Lõuka - Manija - Männikuste - Päraküla - Peerni - Pootsi - Rammuka - Ranniku - Seliste - Tõhela - Tõlli - Värati

Gallery

References

External links
Official website 

 
Former municipalities of Estonia